Assis Naban (4 December 1906 – 9 December 1998) was a Brazilian athlete. He competed in the men's hammer throw at the 1936 Summer Olympics.

References

External links
 

1906 births
1998 deaths
Athletes (track and field) at the 1936 Summer Olympics
Brazilian male hammer throwers
Olympic athletes of Brazil
Athletes from São Paulo